Eyn ol Mejibel (also Romanized as ‘Eyn ol Mejībel; also known as ‘Eyn ol Mejbel, ‘Eyn ol Mejbel, ‘Eyn ol Mejīl, Mojeybel, and Mojeyyel) is a village in Gheyzaniyeh Rural District, in the Central District of Ahvaz County, Khuzestan Province, Iran. At the 2006 census, its population was 27, in 4 families.

References 

Populated places in Ahvaz County